Yahballaha I was bishop of Seleucia-Ctesiphon, grand metropolitan and primate of the Church of the East from 415 to 420.  He is included in the traditional list of patriarchs of the Church of the East.

Sources 
Brief accounts of Yahballaha's reign are given in the Ecclesiastical Chronicle of the Jacobite writer Bar Hebraeus (floruit 1280) and in the ecclesiastical histories of the Nestorian writers Mari (twelfth-century), Amr (fourteenth-century) and Sliba (fourteenth-century).  His life is also covered in the Chronicle of Seert.  In all these accounts he is anachronistically called 'catholicus', a term that was only applied to the primates of the Church of the East towards the end of the fifth century.

Modern assessments of his reign can be found in Wigram's Introduction to the History of the Assyrian Church and David Wilmshurst's The Martyred Church.

Yahballaha's reign 
The following account of Yahballaha's reign is given by Bar Hebraeus:

After Ahai, Yahballaha.  His name means 'gift of God'.  He was a pious and learned man, and was consecrated in the sixteenth year  of Yazdegerd, king of the Persians.  He is said to have brought back to life a dead man.  He was held in great honour by the Persians.  When he had fulfilled his office for five years he was warned by the spirit that Yazdegerd was about to return to his insanity and launch a further persecution against the Christians.  Then, as he had sought in prayer, he departed to God.

See also
 List of patriarchs of the Church of the East

Notes

References
 Abbeloos, J. B., and Lamy, T. J., Bar Hebraeus, Chronicon Ecclesiasticum (3 vols, Paris, 1877)
 Assemani, J. A., De Catholicis seu Patriarchis Chaldaeorum et Nestorianorum (Rome, 1775)
 Brooks, E. W., Eliae Metropolitae Nisibeni Opus Chronologicum (Rome, 1910)
 Gismondi, H., Maris, Amri, et Salibae: De Patriarchis Nestorianorum Commentaria I: Amri et Salibae Textus (Rome, 1896)
 Gismondi, H., Maris, Amri, et Salibae: De Patriarchis Nestorianorum Commentaria II: Maris textus arabicus et versio Latina (Rome, 1899)
Wigram, William Ainger, An Introduction to the History of the Assyrian Church (London, 1910).
Wilmshurst, David, The Martyred Church: A History of the Church of the East (London, 2011).

External links 

Syrian archbishops
Patriarchs of the Church of the East
5th-century bishops of the Church of the East
Christians in the Sasanian Empire